Eureka is a ghost town in Baker County, Oregon, United States, located along Cracker Creek, approximately  north of Sumpter, and  from Bourne. It was originally founded as a mining camp  1892, though by 1945 operations had ceased.

References

1892 establishments in Oregon
Populated places established in 1892
Former populated places in Baker County, Oregon
Ghost towns in Oregon